Ramaperta is a genus of moths belonging to the family Tortricidae.

Species
Ramaperta perarmata Razowski & Becker, 2000
Ramaperta telemaca Razowski & Becker, 2011

See also
List of Tortricidae genera

References

 , 2000: Description of six Brazilian genera of Euliini and their species (Lepidoptera: Tortricidae). SHILAP Revista de Lepidopterología 28: 385–393.
 , 2011: New species of Hynhamia Razowski and other genera close to Toreulia Razowski & Becker (Lepidoptera: Tortricidae). Polish Journal of Entomology 80 (1): 53–82. Full article: .

External links
Tortricid.net

Euliini
Tortricidae genera